The stargazers are a family, Uranoscopidae, of perciform fish that have eyes on top of their heads (hence the name). The family includes about 51 species (one extinct) in eight genera, all marine and found worldwide in shallow and deep saltwaters.

Description 

In addition to the top-mounted eyes, a stargazer also has a large, upward-facing mouth in a large head.  Their usual habit is to bury themselves in sand, and leap upwards to ambush prey (benthic fish and invertebrates) that pass overhead. Some species have a worm-shaped lure growing out of the floors of their mouths, which they can wiggle to attract prey's attention. Both the dorsal and anal fins are relatively long; some lack dorsal spines.  Lengths range from 18 up to 90 cm, for the giant stargazer Kathetostoma giganteum.

Stargazers are venomous; they have two large venomous spines situated behind their opercles and above their pectoral fins. The species within the genera Astroscopus and Uranoscopus can also cause electric shocks. Astroscopus species have a single electric organ consisting of modified eye muscles, while Uranoscopus species have theirs derived from sonic muscles. These two genera within stargazers represent one of eight independent evolutions of bioelectrogenesis. They are unique among electric fish in not possessing electroreceptors, meaning that they do not use an electric sense to locate prey.

Stargazers are a delicacy in some cultures (the venom is not poisonous when eaten), and they can be found for sale in some fish markets with the electric organ removed. Stargazers are ambush predators which camouflage themselves; some can deliver both venom and electric shocks. Ichthyologist Dr. William Leo Smith playfully called them "the meanest things in creation."

Genera 

Uranscopidae contains the following genera:

Timeline

References

Further reading 

 
 

Trachiniformes
Venomous fish
Strongly electric fish
Extant Tortonian first appearances
Taxa named by David Starr Jordan
Taxa named by Barton Warren Evermann